Xaver Landerer (1809 - July 7, 1885) was an author, doctor, physicist, chemist, pharmacist, botanist, and professor.  He was the pharmacist to the first king of Greece Óthon.  He wrote a large number of books about chemistry and pharmacology during the modern scientific revolution.  He was the first chemistry professor in Greece along with Alexander Venizelos.  He helped organize Greek higher education.  He established the first laboratory for pharmaceuticals in Greece.  He influenced Anastassios Christomanos, Anastasios Damvergis and Dimitris Orphanides.   

He was born in Munich.  He studied pharmacology with Johann Andreas Buchner at the University of Munich.  He also wrote articles for his publication Buchner's Repertorium later in life.  Landerer was an exceptional student and pharmacist.  He was selected as the pharmacist to the first king of Greece.  Landerer moved to Greece and remained in the country for the next 54 years of his life.  He wrote a large number of books in the field of chemistry.  He was the dean of the Philosophical School of the University of Athens twice.  The University of Athens was established following the German model.  Landerer was a foreigner that adopted Greece as his new home.  He fought to build up its educational system and include the new nation in the rapidly evolving European scientific community.  He contributed to the fields of inorganic, analytical, medicinal, and pharmaceutical chemistry.  He also wrote many books on the hot springs of Greece.

Biography 

He was born in Munich in 1809.  He studied at the University of Munich around 1831-32.  He studied pharmacology.  One of his professors was Johann Andreas Buchner.  Landerer eventually married Euphrosyne.  The couple had four daughters; three of their names were Sophia, Iphigenia, and Amalia.  All his sons died at a young age.  In 1832, the Kingdom of Greece was established.  Landerer became one of the pharmacists of the new King.   By age 26, Landerer became a citizen of the newly founded Kingdom because of the Greek Nationality Act of 1835.  Between 1834 and 1835, Landerer doctor Ioannis Vouros and the director of the Royal Pharmacy Josef Sartori formed a special committee to assemble a pharmaceutical book known as pharmacopoeia.  The book was characteristic of the pharmaceutical drugs available at the time. The language of the book was Greek and Latin.  The book was published in 1837 it was entitled Greek Pharmacopoeia (Ελληνική Φαρμακοποιΐα).  That same year he became one of the first professors at the newly founded University of Athens.  He taught physics, chemistry, and pharmacology.  He was the first professor of chemistry in Greece.  He helped organize the newly founded university along with Konstantinos Negris and Dimitrios Stroumpos.  Landerer continued writing.  He wrote articles for Buchner's Repertorium a German pharmacological journal founded by his professor Johann Andreas Buchner.   Landerer also did extensive research on the hot springs of Greece.  He was also a notable botanist.  Greek mathematician Ioannis Papadakis also decided to study at the University of Munich around 1836.  

By September 1843, the people were unhappy with the foreign monarch chosen to lead the new country.  They led a rebellion called the The Revolution of September 3, 1843.  The people obtained a constitutional monarchy.  Regrettably, all the foreign professors were expelled from the university in favor of Greek professors.  Landerer, Karl Nikolas Fraas, Friedrich Zentner, Charles Laurent, Christian Hansen, Konstantinos Negris, and Theophil Hansen were all expelled.  Within one year most of the faculty were rehired.  Landerer also became a professor at the Athens Polytechnic University.  He continued teaching physics, chemistry, and pharmacology.  He also began teaching botany.  He taught at two universities and was the royal pharmacist.  He also conducted scientific research and continued publishing books worldwide.  Landerer helped revive the first modern Olympic Games known as the Zappas Olympics.  They were held in 1859, 1870, and 1875 in Athens, Greece.  Landerer was the dean of the philosophical school twice (1846-1847 and 1854-1855).  He also founded the first Laboratory of Pharmaceutical Chemistry in Greece.  He was a member of the Medical Congress.  He retired in 1869 after twenty-five years of service, he was sixty years old.  His student Stamatios D. Krinos replaced him.  Landerer was officially appointed professor emeritus in 1875.  He continued writing, conducting research, and occasionally teaching classes until he died at 76 years old in Athens on July 7, 1885.

Landerer's Pharmaceutical Education
During Landerer's time, the term apothecary was also used to refer to the pharmacist.  The pharmacist candidate had to finish a high school degree.  Pharmacists educated at the University of Athens were required to attend courses in analytical chemistry, physics, mineralogy, zoology, pharmacology, natural history, botany, and the art of prescription.  Students also had to take lessons in history, mathematics, and philosophy.  The theoretical education of pharmacists lasted three years.  After three years the candidate took a written and oral exam.  Finally, students were required to finish one year of work at a pharmacy for their practical skills.  Landerer also wrote several books for his program.  The program was superior to its German counterpart and any other programs offered in Europe.

Children
The couple had four daughters.  Three of their names were Iphigenia, Amalia, and Sophia.  His daughters became very important members of the community.  Amalia was born in 1847.  She married into the prestigious Averoff family.  Her husband was a member of the Greek parliament.  His name was Michael A. Averoff (1840 - 1899). He was the son of Avyerinos Averoff.  She took on the name Amalia Landerer-Averoff. A notable portrait was painted of her by famous Greek painter Ioannis Doukas around 1879. Landerer's other daughter Sophia married Charalambos Kanellopoulos. Their son was Efthimios Kanellopoulos.  Landerer's grandson Efthimios became Minister of National Economy and Foreign Affairs. He was awarded the Silver and Gold Cross of the Savior (1908,1915).  Iphigenia married into the Vassileiadi family.

Literary Works

See Also
Ernst Ziller
Johann Friedrich Julius Schmidt
Karl Nikolas Fraas
Theodor von Heldreich

References

Bibliography

1809 births
1885 deaths
German writers
German physicians
19th-century Greek physicians
19th-century Greek educators
19th-century Greek scientists
Academic staff of the National and Kapodistrian University of Athens
People from Munich
German emigrants to Greece
Ludwig Maximilian University of Munich alumni